The Diocese of Kerry is a Roman Catholic diocese in south-western Ireland, one of six suffragan dioceses in the ecclesiastical province of Cashel and Emly.

The cathedral church of the diocese is St Mary's Cathedral in Killarney, County Kerry.

The incumbent bishop of the diocese is Raymond Browne.

History

The diocese was established in the sixth century as the Diocese of Ardfert and Aghadoe.

Its name was changed to the Diocese of Kerry on 20 December 1952.

Geography
There are 53 parishes in the diocese, which are divided between two civil counties: 44 in County Kerry and nine in County Cork.

The parishes are grouped into 12 pastoral areas, formerly known as deaneries.

As of April 2018, there were 54 priests in the diocese, six of whom were under the age of 50.

Aside from the cathedral town of Killarney, the main towns in the diocese are Castleisland, Kenmare, Listowel, Millstreet, and Tralee.

Ordinaries
The following is a list of  bishops since the name of the diocese was changed in 1952:

 Denis Moynihan (19521969)
 Éamonn Casey (19691976)
 Kevin McNamara (19761984)
 Diarmuid ó Súilleabháin (19851994)
 William Murphy (19952013)
 Raymond Browne (2013present)

See also
 Catholic Church in Ireland

References

External links
 Diocesan website
 Catholic Encyclopedia: Diocese of Kerry and Aghadoe
GCatholic: Kerry (Diocese)
Diocesan Pastoral Plan 2016-2020 (including Parishes and Pastoral Areas)

 
Kerry
Roman Catholic dioceses established in the 12th century
1952 establishments in Ireland
Religion in County Kerry
Religion in County Cork
Roman Catholic Ecclesiastical Province of Cashel